Rental accessories and attachments are additional equipment that supports a larger piece of equipment. When dealing with heavy and specialized equipment, they are typically referred to as attachments.

Types
Attachments or accessories can be mandatory, usually because they are essential to the smooth running of the machine, for example a rotary tool requires a point or attachment to function.

They may also be optional; for example, when renting a car, child safety seats are optional.

Many rental items have hidden or embedded accessories or attachments; for example, rental cars are typically  supplied with a full tank of fuel. Effectively the fuel tank is an embedded accessory.

Some accessories may be consumables, for example dust masks and sanding belts may accompany a floor sander. In this case, the consumables may be billed upfront, or may be supplied on a sale or return basis where the rental company charges based on the unused product returned.

Business advantages for rental companies
From the perspective of a rental company, the presence of attachments or accessories, particularly in the equipment and tool rental sectors, equipment that supports attachments means that fewer pieces of equipment are needed to support a wide variety of applications. This is likely to increase utilization and reduce cost.

In some parts of the rental industry, attachments and accessories are rented independently, so that an equipment owner can rent an attachment.

Swaps 
Attachments may be swapped out or exchanged during a rental contract as site conditions or tasks require alternate attachments. Many attachments for large equipment can easily be replaced on site, while others require a specialist to perform the swap, or may require lifting equipment to allow the swap. This may be managed as a rental relocation or simply as a service order.

Charging and billing
Accessories or attachments may be billed separately or be included within the main piece of equipment.

From a utilization point of view, it should be possible to review both the utilization of an individual attachment, if they are also rented without their main equipment item, or as a subsection of the main item. If individual charges are applied to individual attachments or accessories then this will feed into the financial utilization of the attachment, but may also be regarded as part of the financial utilization of the main item.

References

Renting